The Ford C series is a range of trucks that was produced by Ford between 1957 and 1990.  The first cab-over engine (COE) truck produced with a tilting cab by Ford, the C-series replaced the C-series COE variant of the F-series, produced since 1948.  Produced as both a straight/rigid truck and a tractor, a wide range of versions of C-series was produced, ranging from Class 5 to Class 8 GVWR ratings.  The C-series was also used as a basis for fire apparatus production.

Produced for 33 years nearly unchanged (with the exception of its powertrain), the C-series was the longest-produced commercial truck in North America at the time of its withdrawal; only the Mack Model R (39 years) and Kenworth W900 (59 years) have remained in production longer. In 1986, Ford began phasing in the Ford Cargo in North America, serving as its replacement after the 1990 model year.

C series COE (1948-1956)

Like other automotive manufacturers that built COE trucks before the 1960s, early Ford C-series trucks were "helmet-shaped", cab-forward trucks that shared components with pickup trucks (the F series, in this case). From 1948-52, they were simply COE versions of the F-5, F-6, F-7, and F-8.  For 1953, they were redesignated the C series, but largely remained modified F-series trucks.

Models consisted of the C-500, C-600, C-700, C-750, C-800, C-850 and C-900. Like the F-900, the C-900 also included a "Big Job" model.  Diesel-engined trucks included an extra zero in the model designations (i.e. C-8000 or C-9000).

Design history

As Ford started squaring off its vehicles in 1957, they finally gave the cab-overs their own designs separate from the rest of the Ford truck lineup.  It featured a small grille near the front bumper, with a four-pointed star emblem on each end,  the word "FORD" spelled out below the windshield, and had a cog-and-lightning bolt crest emblem between the headlights. Variations of this emblem were found on many other Ford trucks during the 1950s and into the 1960s. The C series held onto this logo the longest.

Design updates
In a fashion similar to the Checker Marathon or Volkswagen Beetle, changes to the C-series trucks throughout its production were very subtle.  If anywhere, many of these changes were identifiable by the changes in the cowl insignias and badging.  Between 1958 and 1960, the C series used a quad-headlight fascia. This was helpful for fire departments, which wanted to use the extra headlight bezels for emergency flashers, an option that was offered exclusively to fire, and other emergency vehicles after 1960.  In 1961, Ford reverted to the single headlight design; the regular C-series cab closely resembled the 1957 version. A new Super Duty model was added.  Another option included a small sleeper cab.

1963-1990
For 1963, the C series was updated with the same cowl insignias used by the rest of the medium- and heavy-duty truck line up. The logo had the word FORD on top of a trapezoid with the model number designation. This insignia was used until 1967. Also in 1963, Ford introduced diesel versions of the C series, as well as the N series and heavy-duty F series.

In 1968, federal regulations required all automotive manufacturers to add side marker reflectors or lights, which Ford was able to add to the new cowl insignia used on the F series since 1967. That same year, Ford decided to add this insignia on the doors of the C series, as well. Unlike the Ford F series, which removed them for 1973, the C series would retain them until the end of production in 1990.  After 1972, the Canadian Mercury version of the C series was discontinued, becoming the last Mercury truck until the 1993 Mercury Villager.

The year 1974 was the last for the cog-and-lightning bolt crest that graced the front of the C series trucks from the beginning, and other Ford trucks since the 1950s.  In the 1980s, Ford began adding its blue oval logo to all models; it was added to the C series in 1984.

In 1981, the Ford Cargo was introduced by Ford of Britain as its largest truck line.  For 1986, Ford began sales of the Cargo in North America, sourcing production from Ford Brasil.  While the Cargo was largely intended to replace the C-Series, the popularity of the C-Series in niche applications led to both model lines marketed concurrently through the end of the 1980s.

After 33 model years with only minor changes, the final C-Series trucks were built in 1990.  In 1997, production of the Ford Cargo in the US  came to an end, as Ford sold the rights to the model line (alongside that of the Ford Louisville/Aeromax) to Freightliner.

Powertrain

Gasoline engines 
Ford  300 inline-6
Ford 401, 477 & 534 Super Duty V8
Ford 292 & 292HD Y block (1957-1963)
Ford 330MD/HD, 359XD, 361 & 389XD, 391 cubic inch FT V8 (1964-1978)
Lincoln 302 and 332 cubic inch Y-Block V8 (1957-1963)
Ford 370 and 429 cubic inch commercial engines (1979-1990)

Diesel engines
Caterpillar 1160/3208 V8
Cummins N Series inline-6
Cummins C8.3 inline-6
Ford 6.6L & 7.8L inline-6
Detroit 8.2L "Fuel Pincher" V8

Ford H series (1961–1966)
In 1961, Ford introduced a variant of the C series in order to move into the Class 8 COE market.  Named the H series, this version placed the cab much higher on the chassis; instead of being placed underneath the drivers' seat, the front axle was moved forward, directly underneath the driver.  With the higher placement of the cab, space was available for a larger grille, visually similar to the N-series conventional trucks which were introduced later.  The cab cutouts for the C-series front wheels were turned into underfloor toolboxes and luggage space.  With the stacked appearance of the H series, it soon earned the nickname "Two Story Falcon".  HD-series trucks, with Cummins N-series diesels, were the first Ford diesel trucks.

The "Two Story Falcon" lasted until 1966, when it was replaced by the W-series COE trucks.

Usage by other manufacturers
 
Some historians have erroneously referred to the Ford tilt-cab as the "Budd" cab, implying it was an off-the-shelf item available to anyone.  However, the C-series cab was designed by Ford, tooled at its own expense and built by the Budd Company to Ford Motor Company specifications.  Other truck manufacturers had to obtain Ford approval before purchasing it.  The exception was Mack, which bought most of the major cab stampings from Budd and assembled them itself on a floor pan of its own design. In Canada, the Ford "C" had an identical twin - the Mercury "M" Series offered from 1957 to 1972.

At least four truck makers used the Ford C-series tilt cab. Best known was the look-alike Mack model "N", which was produced between 1958 and 1962. The Four-Wheel-Drive Auto Company used some Ford "C" cabs which bore the FWD emblems, and Yankee-Walter used C-series cab components on some of its large airport crash trucks. In Canada, the Thibault fire truck manufacturer of Pierreville, Quebec, also used C-series parts for their Custom (i.e. non-commercial chassis) trucks.

References

Resources 
American Truck & Bus Spotter's Guide: 1920-1985, by Tad Burness.
Ford Trucks Since 1905, by James K. Wagner.
Ford Heavy Duty Trucks 1948-1998, by Paul G. McLaughlin.
Ford Truck Chronicle, by the Auto Editors of the Consumer Guide, with Paul G. McLaughlin.
Enjine!-Enjine! 2001-2: "Let's Hear it for the Tilt-Cab Ford". Walter McCall

External links 

1975 Ford C-series/Howe fire engine (SPAAMFAA)
1964 Ford C-1000/Wesco Fire Engine (SPAAMFAA: Pacific Northwest Chapter)
Ford C-series trucks (Internet Movie Cars Database)

C series
Cab over vehicles
Motor vehicles manufactured in the United States
Vehicles introduced in 1957
Class 5 trucks
Class 6 trucks
Class 7 trucks
Class 8 trucks